Automobiles Stabilia  was an automobile manufacturer based on the north side of Paris between 1906 and 1930.    Although the name of the company changed a couple of times, the cars were branded with the Stabilia name throughout this period.   The company specialised in lowered cars featuring a special patented type of suspension.

History of the business
An automobile constructor named Vrard who had previously worked both for Léon Bollée and for De Dion-Bouton prepared his own prototype and presented it at the Paris Motor Show in 1904.  However, it was not till 1907 that Vrardy founded his own auto-making business  under the name Automobiles Stabilia  and located at Neuilly-sur-Seine.   In 1911 the company mutated into Giraldy et Vrard, although the cars continued to carry the Stabilia name.   Automobile manufacture now took place both at Neuilly-sur-Seine and at premises in nearby  Asnières-sur-Seine.   The company name changed again, to Vrard et Cie, in 1920, but the cars continued to be presented under the name Stabilia.   During the 1920s, by now with just the single production site at  Asnières the volumes produced declined, and production ended altogether in 1930.

The cars
The first production model, produced for 1908, was powered by a four-cylinder engine of 2200cc.   The car featured an “underslung” chassis (with the axles protruding from above the principal longitudinal chassis elements and not, as was more normal at the time, with the principal chassis elements all mounted above the axles).   This provided for a lowered car body that would remain a key element in the appeal of Stabilias. .    Between 1912 and 1914 the manufacturer broadened its range, offering cars of 1500cc, 1700cc and 2700cc engine capacity.
    
The car was priced by the manufacturer at 20,000 francs in bare chassis form. There was also a 14HP model with a 2800cc engine and a four speed transmission. In 1924 Stabilia still appeared at the Motor show, attracting comment with the car’s low-slung chassis. Between 1924 and 1926 Stabilia was offering cars with bought in engines of 1500cc or 2000cc.

From 1927 a few smaller cars were marketed in collaboration with or under license from Automobiles Gobron.   The last car, in 1930, was powered by a straight-eight engine of just 1400cc.

External links
 GTÜ Gesellschaft für Technische Überwachung mbH

Reference, sources and notes

 Harald Linz, Halwart Schrader: Die Internationale Automobil-Enzyklopädie. United Soft Media Verlag, München 2008, . 
 George Nick Georgano (Chefredakteur): The Beaulieu Encyclopedia of the Automobile. Volume 3: P–Z. Fitzroy Dearborn Publishers, Chicago 2001, . (englisch)
 George Nick Georgano: Autos. Encyclopédie complète. 1885 à nos jours. Courtille, Paris 1975. (französisch)

Defunct motor vehicle manufacturers of France
Car manufacturers of France
Vehicle manufacturing companies established in 1907
Vehicle manufacturing companies disestablished in 1930
French companies established in 1907
1930 disestablishments in France